Gavin Stewart (born 27 April 1957) is a British financial services executive and former rower. He competed at the 1988 Summer Olympics and the 1992 Summer Olympics.

He spent 27 years in financial regulation for the Bank of England, Financial Services Authority  and Financial Conduct Authority, before joining Grant Thornton in 2016.
Stewart is also an author and his first novel Walk the Line was published in 2018.

References

External links
 

1957 births
Living people
British male rowers
Olympic rowers of Great Britain
Rowers at the 1988 Summer Olympics
Rowers at the 1992 Summer Olympics
Sportspeople from Belfast
Stewards of Henley Royal Regatta